The 2019 Summit League softball tournament took place from May 8-11, 2019. The top six regular-season finishers of the league's seven teams met in the double-elimination tournament at the Ellig Sports Complex on the campus of North Dakota State University in Fargo, North Dakota.
North Dakota State was the defending champion, and successfully defended their title following their defeat of second-seeded South Dakota in the final round. This was the tenth Summit League title for the Bison, who earned the Summit League's automatic berth to the 2019 NCAA Division I softball tournament with the tournament title.

Format and Seeding
The top six teams from the regular season were seeded one through six based on conference record during the league regular season. The tournament played out as a modified double-elimination tournament, with the bottom four seeds playing each other in the single-elimination first round. The remaining rounds of the tournament were double-elimination.

Schedule

All-Tournament Team
The following players were named to the All-Tournament Team:

References

Summit League softball
2019 NCAA Division I softball season
2019 Summit League softball season